NLE is an acronym. It can refer to:

In education 
 National Latin Exam, a test given to Latin students
 Philippine Nursing Licensure Exam, a basic level nursing exam given in public schools in the Philippines

In science, medicine, and technology 
 Non-linear editing system, a form of audio, video, and image editing
 N.L.E. Tractors, a codename for Cultivator No. 6

In transportation 
 North Luzon Expressway, an expressway located in the Philippines
 The Northern line extension to Battersea, an underground extension project in London
 IATA code for Jerry Tyler Memorial Airport, Niles, Michigan

People 
 NLE Choppa, an American rapper and  his label No Love Entertainment